The 2004–05 Wake Forest Demon Deacons men's basketball team represented Wake Forest University in the 2004–05 season. Led by head coach Skip Prosser and Sophomore Chris Paul, the Demon Deacons put together their most successful season since their 1996–97 Campaign as led by Dave Odom and Tim Duncan. The efforts of Paul earned him a consensus All-American selection, and named him ACC Player of the year. After the season, Paul declared for the NBA draft, and the New Orleans Hornets (now New Orleans Pelicans) selected him fourth overall.

Roster

Tournament results
ACC Tournament 
Vs. NC State @ MCI Center, Washington D.C. - L, 65-81
NCAA Tournament
First Round Vs. Chattanooga @ Wolstein Center, Cleveland, OH - W, 70-54
Second Round Vs. West Virginia @ Wolstein Center, Cleveland, OH - L, 105-111 2OT

References

Wake Forest Demon Deacons men's basketball seasons
Wake Forest
2004 in sports in North Carolina
2005 in sports in North Carolina
Wake Forest